Tim Roper (8 April 1951 in Hampstead, London – February 2003) was the English former drummer of the pub rock band Ducks Deluxe (1972–1975), as well as a member of "Reds, Whites and Blues" with Adrian "Ade" Shaw. After leaving Ducks Deluxe, he became a skilled cabinet maker and carpenter, as well as playing in a number of Norwich-based bands.

He died in Norwich in 2003, from alcohol-related symptoms.

References

1951 births
2003 deaths
People from Hampstead
English rock drummers
Alcohol-related deaths in England
Ducks Deluxe members